Ostrzyca  is a village in the administrative district of Gmina Izbica. It is within Krasnystaw County, Lublin Voivodeship, in eastern Poland.

References

Ostrzyca